Tubuai – Mataura Airport  is an airport on Tubuai in French Polynesia.

Airlines and destinations

Passenger

Statistics

References 

Airports in French Polynesia